is a long-running Japanese seinen manga magazine started in 1967 as a magazine for adult men competing with titles like Manga Action and Big Comic. Today it targets a young adult male audience with contents tilting heavily toward sex, nudity, and gratuitous fan service. It is published monthly by Shōnen Gahōsha as a sister publication to Young King. Its circulation in 2008 was reported at 112,000 copies.

Related magazines
Young King OURs
Young King

References

External links
 

Monthly manga magazines published in Japan
Seinen manga magazines
Magazines established in 1967
Shōnen Gahōsha
1967 establishments in Japan